Kirpaan: The Sword of Honour is a Punjabi film directed by Amrik Gill, and produced by Rajinder Pal Singh Banwait. The story is set in 1850, 1940 and 2013. The film was released on 7 February 2014.

Plot
This movie is about a boy Beeru played by Roshan Prince who is studying in a college and is not serious about his future and doesn't study. His father is always annoyed from him whereas his mother and sister loves him and always stands by his side. He loves a girl named Seerat Sandhu. Though she also likes him but she doesn't like his carefree attitude. He is caught copying in exams and is debarred for three years. On the other hand, Seerat Sandhu is intelligent and wants to make her future. She goes to Chandigarh for higher studies. Beeru goes to meet Seerat Sandhu in University but she gives a cold shoulder. Beeru is devastated. He further knows that his friend Pargat has committed suicide due to failing in exams. He gets a chance to visit his friend Paala in UK where he learns about a sword of his ancestors which is lying in museum. He learns that his ancestor was hanged and the sword ordered to be kept in stadium. He steals the sword and goes to India. Here Seerat Sandhu has become a police officer who vows to arrest him.

Cast
Roshan Prince as 
Gurleen Chopra as Jasmine
Sameksha Singh as Seerat Sandhu
Kulbhushan Kharbanda as Beeru father
Vikas Verma
Sunita Dhir
Shavender Mahal
Jatinder Bhardwaj
Harry Josh
Parmish Verma

References

Punjabi-language Indian films
2010s Punjabi-language films
2014 films
Fictional portrayals of the Punjab Police (India)